Moth is a U.S. alternative rock band from Cincinnati, Ohio formed in 1989. The band has released five albums including a major label release on Virgin Records. They have done live performances on The Late Late Show, AOL, and Mancow's Morning Madhouse, numerous national tours and a UK tour. They have received critical acclaim from Rolling Stone, Blender, Spin, Billboard, Alternative Press, Stuff, CMJ, Guitar World, The New York Times, and Los Angeles Times.

History

Formation and early years (1989-1999)
Stenz grew up in Westwood after moving from New York City when he was 11 years old. At 15 he was a fledgling songwriter who didn't want to sing. He was the reluctant frontman and only ended up singing because no one else would. Stenz attended the School for Creative and Performing Arts, until he convinced his parents he should just do music. He formed the band in 1989 with bassist Jason Hounshell and drummer Kevin Coleman. They called themselves "Bug" for a while, after the album by Dinosaur Jr., whom they admired greatly. In 1991, they recorded their first album.

In October 1992, they began working with James Sfarnas and his label Holographic Records. Under Holographic they re-released their self recorded 1st album Moth. That release was well received with indie press and college radio throughout the U.S.  Following that release, Holographic took the band back in the studio to record "Deeper Green" and "Skinny Flesh" with producer Bill Halverson and was released nationally as a 45 single in 1993. The single received rave reviews and much airplay on college radio and enabled the band to tour for the first time.

Shortly after, Moth began recording songs for their second album 'Big League Fantasy Camp'. The album was released in 1996 after sitting on a shelf for nearly two years while Moth toured heavily on their own dime. All songs were recorded at Findlay Street Recording Studios (except "Deeper Green" and "All") and engineered by Jim Sfarnas, Charles Iliff, Paul Bellows and Moth. "Deeper Green" was recorded and engineered by Bill Gwynne at Group Effort Studios and produced by Bill Halverson. The album was mixed at Quadrafix studios in Hollywood, CA by James Sfarnas, and financed by Holographic Records.

Provisions, Fiction and Gear (2000-2002)

While playing with Guns N' Roses, Tommy Stinson found out that GnR producer Sean Beavan was producing for Moth. Tommy showed interest in the project, and he and Josh Freese joined to play bass and drums with the band. After recording the album, Stinson and Freese were replaced by Theodore Liscinski and Adam Willard. Provisions, Fiction and Gear was recorded at Alpha Studios and released on April 9, 2002. "I See Sound" was released as the first single and was featured on Project Gotham Racing 2.

But when EMI/Virgin decided to drop pop diva Mariah Carey, the resulting financial fallout from her hefty signing and $28 million "severance" forced EMI to completely restructure. The company began letting go of employees and, according to Gayol, "everyone but the multi-platinum artists and artists who sold gold." Provisions, Fiction and Gear had just been released, selling only 10,000 to 15,000 units.

Drop Deaf (2003-2004)
After the break with Virgin, and with two of their band members in Los Angeles, Stenz and guitarist Bob Gayol wanted to keep their music going and enlisted a new rhythm section - a two- or three-month process. The band was rounded out with Bill Buzick on bass and Kevin Hogle on drums, and they began to play live shows to test the new sound. Things went smoothly as the band began to record the new album and establish its own label, Vital Records America.

The label was more about distribution than entrepreneurship. "I really didn't care one way or another whether there was a proper label on the record, but there's been discussion about doing distribution across the pond, and the (distribution) company in England only works with labels, so we had to put it on there", Stenz explained.

Initial tracking took place at local studio, Group Effort, with longtime band ally, Jeff Monroe, while the remainder of the tracks were recorded at Stenz's home-based Studio Red. Stenz assumed responsibility for Drop Deaf'''s production chores and confesses it was "extremely stressful."Drop Deaf was distributed through a few online outlets and the band's website. Despite its limited release, it found some airplay courtesy of ex-Sex Pistol Steve Jones during his "Jonesy's Jukebox" show in Los Angeles' Indie 103.1 radio show. The band toured the UK supported by UK band Tortilla Army to promote the album and headlined the Create Music Festival in Ashford, Kent, UK.

Immune to Gravity and break-up (2004-2007)
Brad's friendship with former A&R exec Todd Sullivan became the catalyst for the next chapter of Moth's lifespan. Brad continued to send songs to Sullivan after the band's departure from Virgin and in spring of 2004, Sullivan headed out to Cincinnati for a look at the new Moth lineup with Kevin Hogle on drums, Eli White on bass, and Eric Diedrichs on guitar. Liking what he witnessed at a downtown festival, Sullivan asked Moth to be the first band signed to his new label, Hey Domingo!.

In 2005, they won the live act of the year at the Cincinnati Entertainment Awards and were the featured artist on MySpace in November. Immune to Gravity was recorded at The Mouse House in Altadena, California and released nationally on March 26, 2006. The song "Perfect" features backing vocals from Inara George. "Are You Really For Real?" was recorded during the Immune to Gravity'' sessions, but was cut from the album.

On June 13, 2006, Stenz created a secret MySpace page under the fictitious band name "Martian Teardrops", uploading several demos for the next album. It contained songs such as "Moth to a Flame" and "Poor Pilot" which became standards in their live set.

In September 2006, Moth performed from the balcony of the Contemporary Arts Center for the MidPoint Music Festival. On October 3, 2006, Stenz announced the new album was expected to be released around spring of 2007. Bassist Eli White left the band to return to college and was replaced by Ryan Malott, lead singer of 500 Miles to Memphis. Stenz ceased working on the new album and went to college to become a pharmacist and Kevin Hogle joined 500 Miles to Memphis.

Post break-up (2008-present)
In August 2008, Stenz became the bassist for Cari Clara and The Turnbull AC's.

On October 18, 2008, Moth played at the American Sign Museum with Eli White on bass.

In March 2009, Stenz formed a cover band with Scott Cunningham, Mike Landis, and Brett Davis called Cover Model.  Greg Slone (former MOTH drummer) joined Cover Model in 2011.

As of summer 2013, Stenz hasn't written any new material but shows interest in returning. "Moth reunion may be in the works ... I've lost all my demos from everything I've done ... So working out new songs is a challenge." 500 Miles to Memphis are recording their 4th studio album. Eric Diedrichs' band Cari Clara recently released a new album titled Midnight March.

Band members

Past members
Brad Stenz - vocals, guitar (1989–2007)
Kevin Coleman - drums (1989–1997)
Jason Hounshell - bass (1989–1994)
Bob Gayol - guitar (1994–2003)
Mike Lamping - bass (1994–1998)
Zy Orange Lyn - violin (1996–1998)
Dan Allaire - drums (1997–1998)
Greg Slone - drums, vocals (1998–2001)
Theodore Liscinski - bass (2001–2003)
Adam Willard - drums (2001–2003)
Kevin Hogle - drums (2003–2007)
Bill Buzeck - bass (2003-2004)
Eric Diedrichs - guitar (2004–2007)
Eli White - bass (2004–2006)
Ryan Malott - bass (2006–2007)

Session & touring musicians
Greg Slone - drums (1998–2001)
Zach Mechlem - bass (1998–2001)
Tommy Stinson - bass (2000–2001)
Josh Freese - drums (2000–2001)
Evan Brass - guitar (2004 UK tour)

Discography

Studio albums

EPs

Splits

Compilation appearances

Videography

Music videos

Video releases

References

External links 
  (Brad Stenz)

Musical groups established in 1989
Alternative rock groups from Ohio
Musical groups from Cincinnati
Musical quartets
American power pop groups